David W. Davenport (February 20, 1890 – October 16, 1954), was a professional baseball player who played pitcher in the Major Leagues from 1914 to 1919. Davenport went on to play for the Cincinnati Reds, St. Louis Terriers, and the St. Louis Browns. He led the Federal League in strikeouts in 1915 while playing for the St. Louis Terriers.
Davenport's Major League career was ended after he was involved in a scuffle with Browns manager Jimmy Burke, after being absent from the team in early September. He was fined $100 and suspended without pay for the rest of the season.  Dave Davenport's .092 batting average in 1915 is the worst ever by a player with at least 140 plate appearances.

He was the brother of former major leaguer Claude Davenport.

See also
List of Major League Baseball annual strikeout leaders
List of Major League Baseball no-hitters

References

Sources
 Baseball Reference
 

Cincinnati Reds players
St. Louis Terriers players
St. Louis Browns players
1890 births
1954 deaths
Major League Baseball pitchers
Baseball players from Louisiana
San Antonio Bronchos players
Sportspeople from Alexandria, Louisiana
Ogden (minor league baseball) players